The 615th Tactical Fighter Squadron is an inactive United States Air Force unit.  It was last assigned to the 35th Tactical Fighter Wing at Phan Rang Air Base, South Vietnam, where it was inactivated on 15 July 1971.

The squadron was first activated during World War II as the 615th Bombardment Squadron.  After training in the United States it moved to England, where it participated in the strategic bombing campaign against Germany.  It earned two Distinguished Unit Citations for combat action.  Following V-E Day, the squadron was inactivated in England.  It was briefly active in the reserves from 1947 to 1949.

The squadron was reactivated as the 615th Fighter-Bomber Squadron in 1957, when the 401st Fighter-Bomber Wing expanded from three to four squadrons.  In 1966, the squadron moved to Phan Rang Air Base, Vietnam, engaging in combat operations until inactivating in 1971 as the United States withdrew its forces from South Vietnam.

History

World War II

Organization and training for combat
The 615th Bombardment Squadron was activated March 1943 at Ephrata Army Air Base Washington as one of the original squadrons of the 401st Bombardment Group.  The initial cadre for the squadron was drawn from the 395th Bombardment Group at Ephrata and the 383d Bombardment Group at Rapid City Army Air Field, South Dakota.  The cadre soon departed for Orlando Army Air Base, Florida, where they conducted simulated combat missions with the Army Air Forces School of Applied Tactics from Brooksville Army Air Field.

The ground echelon moved to Geiger Field, Washington in May 1943 and to Great Falls Army Air Base, Montana in July.  At Great Falls the first combat crews were assigned to the squadron.  In the final stage of training the squadrons dispersed with the 615th training at Lewiston Army Air Field.

After completing training the ground echelon left for overseas on 19 October 1943. The air echelon staged for deployment at Scott Field, Illinois then flew to England under the control of Air Transport Command via Newfoundland, Iceland and Scotland.

Combat in the European Theater
On arrival in England, half of the 401st Group's aircrews were immediately reassigned to the 351st Bombardment Group.  The rest of the squadron became part of Eighth Air Force at RAF Deenethorpe. The 615th became part of the 92d Combat Bombardment Wing of the 1st Bombardment Division. The group's tail code was Triangle-S.

On 26 November the 615th flew its first combat mission against Bremen, Germany.  The 401st Group did not suffer the combat loss of an airplane until its ninth mission on 30 December.   The squadron operated chiefly against strategic targets, bombing industries, submarine facilities, shipyards, missile sites, marshalling yards, and airfields.  On 11 January 1944 the squadron was in the lead group of the 1st Bombardment Division in an attack against aircraft manufacturing facilities at Oschersleben, Germany.  Although the bombers were able to attack, poor weather conditions prevented the division from receiving effective fighter cover.  For over three hours the bomber formation suffered more than 400 attacks by Luftwaffe fighters, including air-to-air rocket attacks.  Despite these attacks the unit continued its attack and struck a telling blow against German aircraft production for which the squadron was awarded a Distinguished Unit Citation (DUC).

A little over a month later, on 20 February, the squadron earned its second DUC for an attack on the Erla Maschinenwerke aircraft manufacturing facilities in Leipzig, Germany.  Despite fighter attacks and battle damage to the group's planes, 100% of the unit’s bombs fell within 1000 feet of the aiming point.  Beginning in October 1944, the unit concentrated its attacks on Axis oil reserves.

In addition to strategic missions, squadron operations included attacks on transportation, airfields, and fortifications prior to Operation Overlord, the Normandy invasion.  On D-Day the 615th attacked Normandy beachhead areas dropping bombs five minutes before troops landed.   The following month it provided close air support for Operation Cobra, the breakthrough at Saint-Lô, it also supported the siege of Brest in August and Operation Market Garden in September.  During the Battle of the Bulge in December 1944 and January 1945, the unit attacked transportation and communications in the battle area.  It supported airborne forces involved in Operation Varsity, the airborne assault across the Rhine in March 1945.

The squadron flew its last combat mission on 20 April 1945 against Brandenberg. It had flown 254 combat missions from Deenethorpe airfield.   After V-E Day, the squadron flew missions to Linz, Austria to evacuate British and French prisoners of war.  It also flew "Trolley" sightseeing missions at low level, flying ground support personnel over the Ruhr and Frankfurt am Main to see the damage that had been done as a result of their efforts.

The unit was alerted for redeployment to the Pacific Theater and the last plane departed Deenethorpe in early June. Upon arrival in the US, personnel were granted thirty days leave, reassembling at Sioux Falls Army Air Field, South Dakota, but plans had changed and personnel were either transferred to Boeing B-29 Superfortress units or processed for discharge and the group was inactivated.

Reserve operations
The squadron was activated at Brooks Field (later Brooks Air Force Base), Texas in June 1947 as a unit of the reserves.  It trained under the supervision of the 178th AAF Base Unit (later 2593d Air Force Reserve Training Center) of Air Defense Command (ADC).  It is not clear whether or not the squadron was fully staffed or equipped.  In 1948, Continental Air Command assumed responsibility for managing reserve and Air National Guard units from ADC.  President Truman’s reduced 1949 defense budget required reductions in the number of units in the Air Force, and the 615th was inactivated in June.

Fighter operations

Tactical Air Command

The squadron was redesignated the 615th Fighter-Bomber Squadron and assigned to the 401st Fighter-Bomber Wing at England Air Force Base, Louisiana in September 1957 as the 401st Wing expanded from three to four squadrons of North American F-100 Super Sabres. The squadron became the 615th Tactical Fighter Squadron a few months later.  It participated in firepower demonstrations military exercises and maneuvers,  It also deployed aircraft and personnel to Europe and the Middle East to support NATO.  During the Cuban Missile Crisis, the squadron operated from Homestead Air Force Base, Florida.  By 1965, however, deployments had begun to the Pacific and Southeast Asia.

Combat in Southeast Asia
In the spring of 1966, the squadron's parent wing moved to Torrejon Air Base, Spain, but the squadron remained at England Air Force Base until July, when it moved to Phan Rang Air Base, Republic of Vietnam and was assigned to the 366th Tactical Fighter Wing.  Shortly after the squadron's arrival at Phan Rang, the 366th Wing moved on paper to Da Nang Air Base, and the 35th Tactical Fighter Wing became the squadron's new headquarters. 
The squadron continued combat operations in Vietnam until the 35th Wing stood down from combat on 26 June 1971.  The squadron was inactivated the following month.

Lineage
 Constituted as the 615th Bombardment Squadron (Heavy) on 20 March 1943
 Activated on 1 April 1943
 Redesignated 615th Bombardment Squadron, Heavy c. 1 November 1943
 Inactivated on 28 August 1945
 Redesignated 615th Bombardment Squadron, Very Heavy on 27 December 1946
 Activated in the reserve on 10 January 1947
 Inactivated on 27 June 1949
 Redesignated 615th Fighter-Bomber Squadron on 30 August 1957
 Activated on 25 September 1957
 Redesignated 615th Tactical Fighter Squadron on 1 July 1958
 Inactivated on 31 July 1971

Assignments
 401st Bombardment Group, 1 April 1943 – 28 August 1945
 Tenth Air Force, 10 January 1947
 401st Bombardment Group, 30 September 1947 – 27 June 1949.
 401st Fighter-Bomber Wing (later Tactical Fighter Wing), 25 September 1957
 834th Air Division, 27 April 1966
 366th Tactical Fighter Wing, 16 July 1966
 35th Tactical Fighter Wing, 10 October 1966 – 31 July 1971

Stations
 Ephrata Army Air Base, Washington, 1 April 1943
 Geiger Field, Washington, 4 June 1943
 Great Falls Army Air Base, Montana, 8 July 1943 – 19 October 1943 (deployed to Lewiston AAF after August)
 RAF Deenethorpe (AAF-128), England, 4 November 1943 – 20 June 1945
 Sioux Falls Army Air Field, South Dakota c. 1–28 August 1945
 Brooks Field (later Brooks Air Force Base), Texas, 26 June 1947 – 27 June 1949
 England Air Force Base, Louisiana, 25 September 1957
 Phan Rang Air Base, Republic of Vietnam, 16 July 1966 – 31 July 1971

Aircraft
 Boeing B-17 Flying Fortress, 1943–1945
 North American F-100 Super Sabre, 1957–1971

Awards and campaigns

See also

 List of United States Air Force fighter squadrons
 List of F-100 units of the United States Air Force 
 B-17 Flying Fortress units of the United States Army Air Forces

References

Notes
 Explanatory notes

 Citations

Bibliography

 
 
 
 
 
 
 
 
  
 

Fighter squadrons of the United States Air Force
Military units and formations of the United States in the Cold War